Kozluca is a village in the İdil District of Şırnak Province in Turkey. The village is populated by Kurds of the Dasikan tribe and had a population of 655 in 2021.

The two hamlets of İnci and Yeşilce are attached to Kozluca.

References 

Villages in İdil District
Kurdish settlements in Şırnak Province